The Vijayanagara musicological nonet or the  are a group of nine musicological treatises written during the reign of the Vijayanagara empire. These works are counted among the most important and definitive treatises in Carnatic music theory. Each of these works contributed seminally to the growth of the Carnatic music tradition.

Historical milieu
The reign of Vijayanagara empire was a watershed period in the cultural history of South India, particularly the history of Carnatic music.  The period witnessed the prolific contributions of numerous musicians, saints and theoreticians.  By virtue of the geo-political influence it exerted, Vijayanagara had become the confluence of many religions, art forms and cultures.  Society and culture went through a process of conflict and eclectic assimilation of the traditional and elite values on the one hand and the emerging folk and foreign influences on the other.  There was a strong interaction between traditional and elite values on the one hand and folk and foreign influences on the other. Much of this was also the result of a reaction and revolt against emerging sociological and aesthetic trends.  Even as this assimilation and nativization of the contending or opposing influences took place, traditional purity and historical continuity continued to be preserved.  These cultural trends and objectives were later sustained and fostered in the several feudatory states that continued to thrive beyond the fall of the Vijayanagar empire.  Some of the notable states included Anegundi, Penukonda, Tanjore, Mysore Kingdom, Madurai, Ikkeri etc.,.

Innovations in theory and practice
A wide range of experiments and innovations were carried out in the field of instruments too. The Tamburi introduced during the period soon became the principal drone instrument. Seminal work and innovations also took place in the Vina keyboards with regard to the accordatura, tonal range and instrumental parameters.

Various melodic and rhythmic structures found their way art music. The totality of melody came to be referred to  alone. The arbitrary, archaic and prolific  made way for the  engendered by the Haridasas. These were further refined based on the principles of the ten vital elements called .

Prominent composers
At the height of the Vijayanagara empire great saint-composers like Purandara Dasa, Sripadaraya, Vyasaraya, Vadirajatirtha, Kanaka Dasa, Tallapakam Annamacharya and his descendants, and Nijagunashivayogi flourished.

The 'nonet'
Throughout the Vijayanagara period, theory and musical practice kept pace with each other closely. Great musicologists like Vidyaranya, Salva Gopa Tippendra, Kallinatha, Kumbhakarna, Ramamatya, Laksmanarayana, Pandarika Vittala, Somanatha, Locana Jha and Hrdayanarayanadeva contributed to musical theory of both North and South India during this period.  Tanappacharya, Govinda Dikshita and Venkatamakhin made foundational contributions from Tanjore about a century later. Each work of these scholars records a revolutionary and seminal concept or development which cumulatively resulted in modern Carnatic music.  Nine musicological treatises of great significance were composed in the Vijayanagar period and these have been called the Vijayanagara  or the 'Vijayanagara Musicological Nonet'.

Sangitasara
The work dealt with, among other things, the fifteen  and their fifty  as well as certain types of singers. Some of this even found its way into Govinda Dikshita's , authored in the early seventeenth century.

Taladipika
Authored in the mid-fifteenth century by Salva Gopa-Tippendra, brother-in-law of king Praudha Devaraya II and a viceroy of Mulbagal, the work deals at great length with the tala. It describes over a hundred desi talas including some of the author's own inventions. This innovation was to prove so influential that, following its explication, all temporal activities in music and dance came to be organized and consolidated under these elements.

Sangitakalanidhi
To the same period belongs the third work of the Nonet, Kallinatha's , a versatile commentary on Sharngadeva's , the encyclopedic magnum opus on Indian music. It was about dancing and aesthetics of the thirteenth century. He anticipated many developments in these arts.

Bhandaru Vittaleshwara's commentary
A Telugu commentary by Bhandaru (-ri?)
 
Sangitasuryodaya
In 1525, Vittaleshwara's son Bhandaru (ri?)

Talakalabdhi/Talakalavriddhi
In the generation that immediately followed, Achyutadevaraya's  was written. In the work, he also compiles views from several earlier works on  such as Talakalavilasa, Sangitavidyavinoda, Jainamata, Sangitamarga, Chaturasabhavilasa, Sangitachudamani, Anjaneyamata, Nrttachudamani, Sangitamanidarpana, Katyayaniya, Sangitarnava, Rangaraja Bharatabhashya, Kapardi, and Parameshvara (all of them non-extant), and refutes them. 
This work is now available only in fragments.

Swaramelakalanidhi
The final 'gem' in the series is the much celebrated  authored by the illustrious Kallinatha's grandson, Ramamatya ca. 1550. Ramamatya was the royal composer and architect in the court of de facto king Aliya Rama Raya. The last epithet however, is usually interpreted by scholars as alluding to the Todarmal, a minister in Akbar's court, the anachronism notwithstanding. The Kannada term, in fact translates to 'the hero (malla) who wears the honorific anklet (todar)'.

 importance lies in the fact that it is more relevant and related to modern practice than the books written prior to it. Minor ideological differences can however be discerned among these works.

It also fixes and standardizes musical intervals on the keyboard, defines the accordatura, range, preferred strings (for particular notes) etc., for a variety of stringed keyboards. It also innovates and dedicates a new keyboard to Achyutaraya.

See also

 Vijayanagara empire
 Carnatic music
 Haridasas and Carnatic music
 Annamacharya

Notes

References
 Svaramelakalanidhi of Ramamatya - by N. Ramanathan

External links
 

Carnatic music
Musicology
Cultural history of Karnataka
Indian music history